Albert Sidney Johnston (February 2, 1803 – April 6, 1862) served as a general in three different armies: the Texian Army, the United States Army, and the Confederate States Army. He saw extensive combat during his 34-year military career, fighting actions in the Black Hawk War, the Texas War of Independence, the Mexican–American War, the Utah War, and the American Civil War.

Considered by Confederate States President Jefferson Davis to be the finest general officer in the Confederacy before the later emergence of Robert E. Lee, he was killed early in the Civil War at the Battle of Shiloh on April 6, 1862. Johnston was the highest-ranking Confederate officer killed during the entire war. Davis believed the loss of General Johnston "was the turning point of our fate."

Johnston was unrelated to Confederate general Joseph E. Johnston.

Early life and education
Johnston was born in Washington, Kentucky, the youngest son of Dr. John and Abigail (Harris) Johnston. His father was a native of Salisbury, Connecticut. Although Albert Johnston was born in Kentucky, he lived much of his life in Texas, which he considered his home. He was first educated at Transylvania University in Lexington, Kentucky, where he met fellow student Jefferson Davis. Both were appointed to the United States Military Academy at West Point, New York, Davis two years behind Johnston. In 1826, Johnston graduated eighth of 41 cadets in his class from West Point with a commission as a brevet second lieutenant in the 2nd U.S. Infantry.

Johnston was assigned to posts in New York and Missouri and served in the brief Black Hawk War in 1832 as chief of staff to Bvt. Brig. Gen. Henry Atkinson.

Marriage and family

In 1829, he married Henrietta Preston, sister of Kentucky politician and future Civil War general William Preston. They had one son, William Preston Johnston, who became a colonel in the Confederate States Army. The senior Johnston resigned his commission in 1834 to care for his dying wife in Kentucky, who succumbed two years later to tuberculosis.

After serving as Secretary of War for the Republic of Texas from 1838 to 1840, Johnston resigned and returned to Kentucky. In 1843, he married Eliza Griffin, his late wife's first cousin. The couple moved to Texas, where they settled on a large plantation in Brazoria County. Johnston named the property "China Grove". Here they raised Johnston's two children from his first marriage and the first three children born to Eliza and him. A sixth child was born later when the family lived in Los Angeles, where they had permanently settled.

Texian Army
In 1836, Johnston moved to Texas. He enlisted as a private in the Texian Army during the Texas War of Independence from the Republic of Mexico. He was named Adjutant General as a colonel in the Republic of Texas Army on August 5, 1836. On January 31, 1837, he became senior brigadier general in command of the Texas Army.

On February 5, 1837, he fought in a duel with Texas Brig. Gen. Felix Huston, who was angered and offended by Johnston's promotion. Johnston was shot through the hip and severely wounded, requiring him to relinquish his post during his recovery.

On December 22, 1838, Mirabeau B. Lamar, the second president of the Republic of Texas, appointed Johnston as Secretary of War. He defended the Texas border against Mexican attempts to recover the state in rebellion. In 1839, he campaigned against Native Americans in northern Texas. In February 1840, he resigned and returned to Kentucky.

United States Army

Johnston returned to Texas during the Mexican–American War (1846–1848) under General Zachary Taylor as a colonel of the 1st Texas Rifle Volunteers. The Polk administration's preference for officers associated with the Democratic Party prevented the promotion of those, such as Johnston, who were perceived as Whigs:

The enlistments of Johnston's volunteers ran out just before the Battle of Monterrey. Johnston convinced a few volunteers to stay and fight as he served as the inspector general of volunteers and fought at the battles of Monterrey and Buena Vista. Future U.S. general, Joseph Hooker, was with Johnston at Monterrey. Hooker wrote: "It was through [Johnston's] agency, mainly, that our division was saved from a cruel slaughter... The coolness and magnificent presence [that he] displayed on this field... left an impression on my mind that I have never forgotten."

He remained on his plantation after the war until he was appointed by later 12th president Zachary Taylor to the U.S. Army as a major and was made a paymaster in December 1849. He served in that role for more than five years, making six tours and traveling more than  annually on the Indian frontier of Texas. He served on the Texas frontier at Fort Mason and elsewhere in the western United States.

In 1855, 14th president Franklin Pierce appointed him colonel of the new 2nd U.S. Cavalry (the unit that preceded the modern 5th U.S.), a new regiment, which he organized, his lieutenant colonel being Robert E. Lee, and his majors William J. Hardee and George H. Thomas. Other subordinates in this unit included Earl Van Dorn, Edmund Kirby Smith, Nathan G. Evans, Innis N. Palmer, George Stoneman, R.W. Johnson, John B. Hood, and Charles W. Field, all future Civil War generals.

Utah War
As a key figure in the Utah War, Johnston took command of the U.S. forces in November 1857. This army was sent to install Alfred Cummings as governor of the Utah Territory, replacing Brigham Young. After the army wintered at Fort Bridger, Wyoming, a peaceful resolution was reached. In late June 1858, Johnston led the army through Salt Lake City without incident to establish Camp Floyd some 50 miles distant. He received a brevet promotion to brigadier general in 1857 for his service in Utah. He spent 1860 in Kentucky until December 21, when he sailed for California to take command of the Department of the Pacific.

Slavery
Johnston was a proponent of slavery and an enslaver. In 1846, he enslaved a family of four in Texas. In 1855, having discovered that an enslaved person was stealing from the army payroll, Johnston refused to have him physically punished and instead sold him for $1,000 to recoup the losses. Johnston explained that "whipping will not restore what is lost and it will not benefit the [culprit], whom a lifetime of kind treatment has failed to make honest."  In 1856, he called abolitionism "fanatical, idolatrous, negro worshipping" in a letter to his son, fearing that the abolitionists would incite a servile insurrection in the southern states. Upon moving to California, Johnston sold one enslaved person to his son and freed another, Randolph or "Ran", who agreed to accompany the family on the condition of a $12/month contract for five more years of servitude. Ran accompanied Johnston throughout the American Civil War until the latter's death. Johnston's wife, Eliza, celebrated the lack of black people in California, writing, "where the darky is in any numbers it should be as slaves."

American Civil War

At the outbreak of the American Civil War, Johnston was the commander of the U.S. Army Department of the Pacific in California. Like many regular army officers from the Southern United States, he opposed secession. Nevertheless, Johnston resigned his commission soon after he heard of the Confederate states' declarations of secession. The War Department accepted it on May 6, 1861, effective May 3. On April 28, he moved to Los Angeles, the home of his wife's brother John Griffin. Considering staying in California with his wife and five children, Johnston remained there until May. A sixth child was born in the family home in Los Angeles. His eldest son, Capt. Albert S. Johnston, Jr. was later killed in an accidental explosion on a steamer ship while on liberty in Los Angeles in 1863.

Soon, Johnston enlisted in the Los Angeles Mounted Rifles as a private, leaving Warner's Ranch on May 27. He participated in their trek across the southwestern deserts to Texas, crossing the Colorado River into the Confederate Territory of Arizona on July 4, 1861. His escort was commanded by Alonzo Ridley, Undersheriff of Los Angeles, who remained at Johnston's side until he was killed.

Early in the Civil War, Confederate President Jefferson Davis decided that the Confederacy would attempt to hold as much territory as possible, distributing military forces around its borders and coasts. In the summer of 1861, Davis appointed several generals to defend Confederate lines from the Mississippi River east to the Allegheny Mountains.

The most sensitive, and in many ways, the most crucial areas, along the Mississippi River and in western Tennessee along the Tennessee and the Cumberland rivers were placed under the command of Maj. Gen. Leonidas Polk and Brig. Gen. Gideon J. Pillow. The latter had initially been in command in Tennessee as that State's top general. Their impolitic occupation of Columbus, Kentucky, on September 3, 1861, two days before Johnston arrived in the Confederacy's capital of Richmond, Virginia, after his cross-country journey, drove Kentucky from its stated neutrality. The majority of Kentuckians allied with the U.S. camp. Polk and Pillow's action gave U.S. Brig. Gen. Ulysses S. Grant an excuse to take control of the strategically located town of Paducah, Kentucky, without raising the ire of most Kentuckians and the pro-U.S. majority in the State legislature.

Confederate command in Western Theater
On September 10, 1861, Johnston was assigned to command the huge area of the Confederacy west of the Allegheny Mountains, except for coastal areas. He became commander of the Confederacy's western armies in the area often called the Western Department or Western Military Department. Johnston's appointment as a full general by his friend and admirer Jefferson Davis had already been confirmed by the Confederate Senate on August 31, 1861. The appointment had been backdated to rank from May 30, 1861, making him the second-highest-ranking general in the Confederate States Army. Only Adjutant General and Inspector General Samuel Cooper ranked ahead of him. After his appointment, Johnston immediately headed for his new territory. He was permitted to call on Arkansas, Tennessee, and Mississippi governors for new troops. However, politics largely stifled this authority, especially concerning Mississippi. On September 13, 1861, Johnston ordered Brig. Gen. Felix Zollicoffer with 4,000 men to occupy Cumberland Gap in Kentucky to block U.S. troops from coming into eastern Tennessee. The Kentucky legislature had voted to side with the United States after the occupation of Columbus by Polk. By September 18, Johnston had Brig. Gen. Simon Bolivar Buckner with another 4,000 men blocking the railroad route to Tennessee at Bowling Green, Kentucky.

Johnston had fewer than 40,000 men spread throughout Kentucky, Tennessee, Arkansas, and Missouri. Of these, 10,000 were in Missouri under Missouri State Guard Maj. Gen. Sterling Price. Johnston did not quickly gain many recruits when he first requested them from the governors, but his more serious problem was lacking sufficient arms and ammunition for the troops he already had. As the Confederate government concentrated efforts on the units in the East, they gave Johnston small numbers of reinforcements and minimal amounts of arms and material. Johnston maintained his defense by conducting raids and other measures to make it appear he had larger forces than he did, a strategy that worked for several months. Johnston's tactics had so annoyed and confused U.S. Brig. Gen. William Tecumseh Sherman in Kentucky that he became paranoid and mentally unstable. Sherman overestimated Johnston's forces and was relieved by Brig. Gen. Don Carlos Buell on November 9, 1861. However, in his Memoirs, Sherman strongly refutes this account.

Battle of Mill Springs
East Tennessee (a heavily pro-U.S. region of the southern U.S. during the Civil War) was occupied for the Confederacy by two unimpressive brigadier generals appointed by Jefferson Davis: Felix Zollicoffer, a brave but untrained and inexperienced officer, and soon-to-be Maj. Gen. George B. Crittenden, a former U.S. Army officer with apparent alcohol problems. While Crittenden was away in Richmond, Zollicoffer moved his forces to the north bank of the upper Cumberland River near Mill Springs (now Nancy, Kentucky), putting the river to his back and his forces into a trap. Zollicoffer decided it was impossible to obey orders to return to the other side of the river because of the scarcity of transport and proximity of U.S. troops. When U.S. Brig. Gen. George H. Thomas moved against the Confederates, Crittenden decided to attack one of the two parts of Thomas's command at Logan's Cross Roads near Mill Springs before the U.S. forces could unite. At the Battle of Mill Springs on January 19, 1862, the ill-prepared Confederates, after a night march in the rain, attacked the U.S. soldiers with some initial success. As the battle progressed, Zollicoffer was killed, Crittenden could not lead the Confederate force (he may have been intoxicated), and the Confederates were turned back and routed by a U.S. bayonet charge, suffering 533 casualties from their force of 4,000. The Confederate troops who escaped were assigned to other units as General Crittenden faced an investigation of his conduct.

After the Confederate defeat at Mill Springs, Davis sent Johnston a brigade and a few other scattered reinforcements. He also assigned him Gen. P. G. T. Beauregard, who was supposed to attract recruits because of his victories early in the war and act as a competent subordinate for Johnston. The brigade was led by Brig. Gen. John B. Floyd, considered incompetent. He took command at Fort Donelson as the senior general present just before U.S. Brig. Gen. Ulysses S. Grant attacked the fort. Historians believe the assignment of Beauregard to the west stimulated U.S. commanders to attack the forts before Beauregard could make a difference in the theater. U.S. Army officers heard that he was bringing 15 regiments with him, but this was an exaggeration of his forces.

Fort Henry, Fort Donelson, Nashville
Based on the assumption that Kentucky neutrality would act as a shield against a direct invasion from the north, circumstances that no longer applied in September 1861, Tennessee initially had sent men to Virginia and concentrated defenses in the Mississippi Valley. Even before Johnston arrived in Tennessee, construction of two forts had been started to defend the Tennessee and the Cumberland rivers, which provided avenues into the State from the north. Both forts were located in Tennessee to respect Kentucky neutrality, but these were not in ideal locations. Fort Henry on the Tennessee River was in an unfavorable low-lying location, commanded by hills on the Kentucky side of the river. Fort Donelson on the Cumberland River, although in a better location, had a vulnerable land side and did not have enough heavy artillery to defend against gunboats.

Maj. Gen. Polk ignored the problems of the forts when he took command. After Johnston took command, Polk at first refused to comply with Johnston's order to send an engineer, Lt. Joseph K. Dixon, to inspect the forts. After Johnston asserted his authority, Polk had to allow Dixon to proceed. Dixon recommended that the forts be maintained and strengthened, although they were not in ideal locations, because much work had been done on them, and the Confederates might not have time to build new ones. Johnston accepted his recommendations. Johnston wanted Major Alexander P. Stewart to command the forts, but President Davis appointed Brig. Gen. Lloyd Tilghman as commander.

To prevent Polk from dissipating his forces by allowing some men to join a partisan group, Johnston ordered him to send Brig. Gen. Gideon Pillow and 5,000 men to Fort Donelson. Pillow took up a position at nearby Clarksville, Tennessee, and did not move into the fort until February 7, 1862. Alerted by a U.S. reconnaissance on January 14, 1862, Johnston ordered Tilghman to fortify the high ground opposite Fort Henry, which Polk had failed to do despite Johnston's orders. Tilghman failed to act decisively on these orders, which were too late to be adequately carried out in any event.

Gen. Beauregard arrived at Johnston's headquarters at Bowling Green on February 4, 1862, and was given overall command of Polk's force at the western end of Johnston's line at Columbus, Kentucky. On February 6, 1862, U.S. gunboats quickly reduced the defenses of ill-sited Fort Henry, inflicting 21 casualties on the small remaining Confederate force. Brig. Gen. Lloyd Tilghman surrendered the 94 remaining officers and men of his approximately 3,000-man force, which had not been sent to Fort Donelson before Grant's U.S. forces could even take up their positions. Johnston knew he could be trapped at Bowling Green if Fort Donelson fell, so he moved his force to Nashville, the capital of Tennessee and an increasingly important Confederate industrial center, beginning on February 11, 1862.

Johnston also reinforced Fort Donelson with 12,000 more men, including those under Floyd and Pillow, a curious decision given his thought that the U.S. gunboats alone could take the fort. He ordered the fort commanders to evacuate the troops if the fort could not be held. The senior generals sent to the fort to command the enlarged garrison, Gideon J. Pillow and John B. Floyd, squandered their chance to avoid having to surrender most of the garrison and on February 16, 1862, Brig. Gen. Simon Buckner, having been abandoned by Floyd and Pillow, surrendered Fort Donelson. Colonel Nathan Bedford Forrest escaped with his cavalry force of about 700 men before the surrender. The Confederates suffered about 1,500 casualties, with an estimated 12,000 to 14,000 taken prisoner. U.S. casualties were 500 killed, 2,108 wounded, and 224 missing.

Johnston, who had little choice in allowing Floyd and Pillow to take charge at Fort Donelson based on seniority after he ordered them to add their forces to the garrison, took the blame and suffered calls for his removal because a full explanation to the press and public would have exposed the weakness of the Confederate position. His passive defensive performance while positioning himself in a forward position at Bowling Green, spreading his forces too thinly, not concentrating his forces in the face of U.S. advances, and appointing or relying upon inadequate or incompetent subordinates subjected him to criticism at the time and by later historians. The fall of the forts exposed Nashville to an imminent attack, and it fell without resistance to U.S. forces under Brig. Gen. Buell on February 25, 1862, two days after Johnston had to pull his forces out to avoid having them captured as well.

Concentration at Corinth
Johnston had various remaining military units scattered throughout his territory and retreating to the south to avoid being cut off. Johnston himself retreated with the force under his personal command, the Army of Central Kentucky, from the vicinity of Nashville. With Beauregard's help, Johnston decided to concentrate forces with those formerly under Polk and now already under Beauregard's command at the strategically located railroad crossroads of Corinth, Mississippi, which he reached by a circuitous route. Johnston kept the U.S. forces, now under the overall command of the ponderous Maj. Gen. Henry Halleck, confused and hesitant to move, allowing Johnston to reach his objective undetected. This delay allowed Jefferson Davis finally to send reinforcements from the garrisons of coastal cities and another highly rated but prickly general, Braxton Bragg, to help organize the western forces. Bragg at least calmed the nerves of Beauregard and Polk, who had become agitated by their apparent dire situation in the face of numerically superior forces, before Johnston's arrival on March 24, 1862.

Johnston's army of 17,000 men gave the Confederates a combined force of about 40,000 to 44,669 men at Corinth. On March 29, 1862, Johnston officially took command of this combined force, which continued to use the Army of the Mississippi name under which Beauregard had organized it on March 5.

Johnston planned to defeat the U.S. forces piecemeal before the U.S. soldiers in Kentucky and Tennessee under Grant with 40,000 men at nearby Pittsburg Landing, Tennessee, and the now Maj. Gen. Don Carlos Buell, on his way from Nashville with 35,000 men, could unite against him. Johnston started his army in motion on April 3, 1862, intent on surprising Grant's force as soon as the next day. Still, they moved slowly due to inexperience, bad roads, and inadequate staff planning.  Due to the delays, as well as several contacts with the enemy, Johnston's second in command, P. G. T. Beauregard, felt the element of surprise had been lost and recommended calling off the attack. Johnston proceeded as planned, stating, "I would fight them if they were a million." His army was finally in position within a mile or two of Grant's force, undetected, by the evening of April 5, 1862.

Battle of Shiloh and death

Johnston launched a massive surprise attack with his concentrated forces against Grant at the Battle of Shiloh on April 6, 1862. As the Confederate forces overran the U.S. camps, Johnston personally rallied troops up and down the line on his horse. One of his famous moments in the battle occurred when he witnessed some of his soldiers breaking from the ranks to pillage and loot the U.S. camps and was outraged to see a young lieutenant among them. "None of that, sir", Johnston roared at the officer, "we are not here for plunder."  Then, realizing he had embarrassed the man, he picked up a tin cup from a table and announced, "Let this be my share of the spoils today", before directing his army onward.

At about 2:30 pm, while leading one of those charges against a U.S. camp near the "Peach Orchard", he was wounded, taking a bullet behind his right knee. The bullet clipped a part of his popliteal artery, and his boot filled up with blood. No medical personnel were on the scene since Johnston had sent his personal surgeon to care for the wounded Confederate troops and U.S. prisoners earlier in the battle.

Within a few minutes, Johnston was observed by his staff to be nearly fainting. Among his staff was Isham G. Harris, the Governor of Tennessee, who had ceased to make any real effort to function as governor after learning that Abraham Lincoln had appointed Andrew Johnson as military governor of Tennessee. Seeing Johnston slumping in his saddle and his face turning deathly pale, Harris asked: "General, are you wounded?" Johnston glanced down at his leg wound, then faced Harris and said his last words in a weak voice: "Yes... and I fear seriously." Harris and other staff officers removed Johnston from his horse, carried him to a small ravine near the "Hornets Nest", and desperately tried to aid the general, who had lost consciousness. Harris then sent an aide to fetch Johnston's surgeon but did not apply a tourniquet to Johnson's wounded leg. A few minutes later, Johnston died from blood loss before a doctor could be found. It is believed that Johnston may have lived for as long as one hour after receiving his fatal wound. Ironically, it was later discovered that Johnston had a tourniquet in his pocket when he died.

Harris and the other officers wrapped General Johnston's body in a blanket to not damage the troops' morale with the sight of the dead general. Johnston and his wounded horse, Fire Eater, were taken to his field headquarters on the Corinth road, where his body remained in his tent for the remainder of the battle. P. G. T. Beauregard assumed command of the army. He resumed leading the Confederate assault, which continued advancing and pushed the U.S. forces back to a final defensive line near the Tennessee river. With his army exhausted and daylight almost gone, Beauregard called off the final Confederate attack around 1900 hours, figuring he could finish off the U.S. army the following morning. However, Grant was reinforced by 20,000 fresh troops from Don Carlos Buell's Army of the Ohio during the night and led a successful counter-attack the following day, driving the Confederates from the field and winning the battle. As the Confederate army retreated to Corinth, Johnston's body was taken to the home of Colonel William Inge, which had been his headquarters in Corinth. It was covered in the Confederate flag and lay in state for several hours.

It is possible that a Confederate soldier fired the fatal round, as many Confederates were firing at the U.S. lines while Johnston charged well in advance of his soldiers.  Alonzo Ridley of Los Angeles commanded the bodyguard "the Guides" of Gen. A. S. Johnston and was by his side when he fell.

Johnston was the highest-ranking fatality of the war on either side, and his death was a strong blow to the morale of the Confederacy. At the time, Davis considered him the best general in the country.

Legacy and honors

Johnston was survived by his wife, Eliza, and six children. His wife and five younger children, including one born after he went to war, chose to live out their days at home in Los Angeles with Eliza's brother, Dr. John Strother Griffin. Johnston's eldest son, Albert Sidney Jr. (born in Texas), had already followed him into the Confederate States Army. In 1863, Albert Jr. was on his way out of San Pedro harbor on a ferry after taking home leave in Los Angeles. While a steamer was taking on passengers from the ferry, a wave swamped the smaller boat, causing its boilers to explode. Albert Jr. was killed in the accident.

Upon his passing, General Johnston received the highest praise ever given by the Confederate government: accounts were published on December 20, 1862, and after that, in the Los Angeles Star of his family's hometown. Johnston Street, Hancock Street, and Griffin Avenue, each in northeast Los Angeles, are named after the general and his family, who lived in the neighborhood.

Johnston was initially buried in New Orleans. In 1866, a joint resolution of the Texas Legislature was passed to have his body moved and reinterred at the Texas State Cemetery in Austin. The re-interment occurred in 1867. Forty years later, the state appointed Elisabet Ney to design a monument and sculpture of him to be erected at the grave site, installed in 1905.

The Texas Historical Commission has erected a historical marker near the entrance of what was once Johnston's plantation. An adjacent marker was erected by the San Jacinto Chapter of the Daughters of The Republic of Texas and the Lee, Roberts, and Davis Chapter of the United Daughters of the Confederate States of America.

In 1916, the University of Texas at Austin recognized several confederate veterans (including Johnston) with statues on its South Mall. On August 21, 2017, as part of the wave of confederate monument removals in America, Johnston's statue was taken down. Plans were announced to add it to the Briscoe Center for American History on the east side of the university campus.

Johnston was inducted to the Texas Military Hall of Honor in 1980.

In the fall of 2018, A. S. Johnston Elementary School in Dallas, Texas, was renamed Cedar Crest Elementary. Johnston Middle School in Houston, Texas, was also renamed Meyerland Middle School. Three other elementary schools named for Confederate veterans were renamed simultaneously.

See also

 List of American Civil War generals (Confederate)
 List of Confederate monuments and memorials

Notes

References
 Beauregard, G. T. The Campaign of Shiloh. p. 579. In Battles and Leaders of the Civil War, vol. I, edited by Robert Underwood Johnson and Clarence C. Buel. New York: Century Co., 1884–1888. .
 
 
 
 
 
 Dupuy, Trevor N., Curt Johnson, and David L. Bongard. Harper Encyclopedia of Military Biography. New York: HarperCollins, 1992. .
 
 
 
 Hattaway, Herman, and Archer Jones. How the North Won: A Military History of the Civil War. Urbana: University of Illinois Press, 1983. .
 
 
 
 
 Long, E. B. The Civil War Day by Day: An Almanac, 1861–1865. Garden City, NY: Doubleday, 1971. .

Further reading

External links

Eliza Johnston, Wife Of Confederate General Albert Sidney Johnston
Albert Sidney Johnston at Handbook of Texas Online
 

1803 births
1862 deaths
 
American proslavery activists
American slave owners
Confederate States of America military personnel killed in the American Civil War
Deaths from bleeding
Burials at Texas State Cemetery
Confederate States Army full generals
People from Washington, Kentucky
People from Texas
People of California in the American Civil War
People of Texas in the American Civil War
American people of the Black Hawk War
Transylvania University alumni
United States Army generals
United States Military Academy alumni
People of the Texas Revolution
People of the Utah War
United States politicians killed during the Civil War
Preston family of Virginia